Manuwarra Red Dog Highway is a major road currently under construction in the Pilbara region of Western Australia, between Karratha and Tom Price. Originally known as Karratha-Tom Price Road, it acquired its new name in September 2020 after community consultation. Manuwarra means heaps' or 'masses in the Yindjibarndi language and is the indigenous name for the Red Dog Gorge in the Millstream Chichester National Park. Both the gorge and the highway acquired its English name from the eponymous Red Dog, a famous Kelpie/Cattle Dog and Pilbara mascot from the 1970s.

History 
The need for a more direct sealed road between the areas surrounding Karratha and Tom Price was identified in the 1990s. Before Stages one to three of Manuwarra Red Dog Highway were constructed, access from Karratha to Tom Price (on the public roads) was via the Roebourne-Wittenoom Road, the Nanutarra-Munjina Road and the Tom Price Spur Road. However, historical traffic data showed that most vehicles commuting between Karratha and Tom Price were using the more direct route along the Rio Tinto-owned access road for the Dampier to Paraburdoo railway rather than the public roads. However, this route had a high accident rate, and requires a permit to be obtained from Rio Tinto to use the road.

Route description 
Manuwarra Red Dog Highway roughly follows the route of the Dampier to Paraburdoo railway for its entire length (including the as-yet incomplete stage four). This is to avoid impacts to the nearby Millstream Chichester National Park and the catchment of the Harding Dam (an important source of drinking water), as well as several Aboriginal heritage sites.

Southern section 
Here the road turns to the north. It then begins to run alongside the railway, turns to the north and continues so for the next , where the southern portion of the road currently ends at Nanutarra-Munjina Road. Here drivers may continue north by travelling a short distance on the Nanutarra-Munjina Road, then (if they possess a permit) turning onto the Rio-Tinto owned access road for the Dampier to Paraburdoo railway, or can continue on Nanutarra-Munjina Road to access Roebourne-Wittenoom Road.

Northern section 
The constructed road continues just after the railway crossing where the Roebourne-Wittenoom Road crosses the Dampier to Paraburdoo railway. It meets the Railway access road at a T-junction shortly after the crossing. It continues west for  where it begins to turn to the north-west.  further along it meets the access road for the Millstream Chichester National Park, where it then starts to diverge from the railway line, as the railway turns to the north. The road then follows the railway, deviating only to avoid terrain constraints, for the next  to Karratha, where it ends at a T-junction with the North West Coastal Highway. Drivers can then use Madigan Road to access the town of Karratha.

Construction 
Manuwarra Red Dog Highway is being constructed in four stages.

Stage One, Tom Price to Nanutarra-Munjina Road 
Construction on Manuwarra Red Dog Highway (then known as Karratha-Tom Price Road) began in January 2003, with work beginning on the   Stage one, which followed the Dampier to Paraburdoo railway corridor from Tom Price north to Nanutarra-Munjina Road, with a budget of $18.7 million.

Stage Two, Karratha to Curlewis 
Whilst the northern portion of the route is relatively flat, the southern section was much more challenging, and required significant earthworks. Stage three had an estimated cost of $80 million. Construction of Stage two started in August 2006 and was completed in August 2008 at a cost of $150 million.

Stage Three, Curlewis to Wallyinya Pool 
This portion involved sealing and upgrading the existing road. During construction, traffic was diverted onto the adjacent access road for the Dampier to Paraburdoo railway.  

Whilst the terrain was less challenging than for Stage two, the road had been used for carting asbestos from the mines near Wittenoom to the port. Bags of asbestos would often fall off the trucks on the way, resulting in the road becoming heavily contaminated. The danger posed by the asbestos was such that, in 2018, the Shire of Ashburton, which manages the road, ceased maintaining it on advice from WorkSafe. The contamination issue caused delays to this stage, but work eventually began in September 2019, and was completed in September 2020 at a cost of $81.5 million. At around the same time work was conducted on the section of Roebourne-Wittenoom Road between Wallyinya Pool and Nanutarra-Munjina Road (which was not to be sealed as part of Manuwarra Red Dog Highway), to repair and remediate that section of road, as it had not been maintained for many months, and was in urgent need of repair.

Stage four, Wallyinya Pool to Nanutarra-Munjina Road 
As of October 2021, Stage four of Manuwarra Red Dog Highway is currently in the design phase, with work underway to identify a final alignment for the road. Construction is expected to start on this  section in early 2022. The estimated cost for Stage four is around $229 million.

See also 
 List of highways in Western Australia
 Major roads in the Pilbara region of Western Australia
 List of road routes in Western Australia

References 

Highways in rural Western Australia
Pilbara